Sterpuric acid is a phytotoxic metabolite derived from the fungus Stereum purpureum, from which it derives its name. This fungus causes silver-leaf disease of fruit trees.

References

Carboxylic acids
Mycotoxins
Tertiary alcohols
Terpenes and terpenoids
Cyclobutanes